3 minuti is the second studio album by singer-songwriter Umberto Alongi, released for digital distribution by iM Digital Records on 2 December 2016.

Recording
3 minuti was recorded over 6 months in Lugano with members of Simone Tomassini' band (Roberto Colombo and Riccardo Di Filippo) and Matia Bazar (Angelo Quatrale). It was mixed by Robb Hutzal. This album has been written with Valentino Alfano (for "3 minuti") Mina, Matteo Di Franco (for "Qui") Celentano, Andrea Bocelli, Patty Pravo and Andrea Zuppini (for "Qui") Alex Baroni, Fabio Concato.

Track listing
"Guardami ancora"
"3 minuti"
"Assurde gelosie"
"Vivila" 
"Venere"
"Ora e sempre"
"Non dici niente"
"Qui"
"I can just be me"
"In mezzo ai sogni"

Personnel
Umberto Alongi – Vocal
Angelo Quatrale – Bass
Roberto Colombo – Keyboards
Riccardo Di Filippo – Guitars
Christian Daniel – Drums
Chiara Giudici – Backing vocals

Production
Robb Hutzal – Mixing

References

2016 albums